Lameira is a closed halt on the Algarve line in the Silves municipality, Portugal. It is part of the section from Algoz to Poço Barreto, which opened on the 19th of March 1900.

References

Railway stations in Portugal
Railway stations opened in 1900